The Albemarle and Chesapeake Canal was built by a corporation in 1856-1860 to afford inland navigation between the Chesapeake Bay and the Albemarle Sound. It is really two canals, thirty miles (50 km) apart, one eight and one-half miles (13.7 km) long, connecting the Elizabeth River with the North Landing River in Virginia, and the other five and one-half miles (8.9 km) long, connecting the Currituck Sound with the North River in North Carolina.

It was listed on the National Register of Historic Places in 2003.

Sources
Dictionary of American History, by James Truslow Adams, New York: Charles Scribner's Sons, 1940

References

Canals on the National Register of Historic Places in North Carolina
Canals on the National Register of Historic Places in Virginia
Geography of Currituck County, North Carolina
Intracoastal Waterway
Geography of Chesapeake, Virginia
Transportation in Currituck County, North Carolina
Buildings and structures in Currituck County, North Carolina
Transportation in Chesapeake, Virginia
National Register of Historic Places in Chesapeake, Virginia
Historic districts on the National Register of Historic Places in Virginia
Historic districts on the National Register of Historic Places in North Carolina